The Herald (also styled as Barossa Herald, Barossa and Light Herald, or Barossa & Light Herald) is a weekly newspaper published in Tanunda, South Australia. With its earliest beginnings in 1860, it has been published under the Herald banner since 2005. It was later sold to Rural Press, previously owned by Fairfax Media, but now an Australian media company trading as Australian Community Media.

History
The Barossa and Light Herald began publication on 10 May 1951 after Leslie Tilbrook (who had owned the Kapunda Herald since September 1923) sold the newspaper. A new publication was then created by the merger of:

 Kapunda Herald (1860-1951): This publication began life as the Northern Star (1860-1863), the first English-language newspaper in regional South Australia. It then transformed into the Kapunda Herald and Northern Intelligencer (1864-1877) when it changed ownership. By 1878, and with another new owner, the title was simplified.
 Barossa News (1908-1951): The first newspaper to provide any significant local news coverage to the Barossa towns, the Barossa News, was established by John Birdseye Cant, a Western Australian printer and newspaperman. Initially just 500 copies were printed, but after a few years the circulation had risen to 2,500.

In 1981, the newspaper then absorbed the Eudunda Courier (9 February 1922–15 April 1981). The newspaper was later taken over by the Rural Press in the 1990s and was a part of the Fairfax Media group. In May 2005 the title was again shortened, this time to simply Herald, though the longer variants of the previous name (Barossa Herald, Barossa and Light Herald, or Barossa & Light Herald) are commonly used as well.

Distribution
In 2012, the Herald claimed the largest circulation for a country newspaper in South Australia at 21,400 copies distributed weekly. By 2018, the average issue readership for the print version was calculated to be 29,000  Like other Rural Press publications, the newspaper is also available online.

Digitisation
The State Library of South Australia carries microfiche copies of older versions of the newspaper.

References

External links
 Herald website
 Australian Community Media statistics

Newspapers published in South Australia
Publications established in 2005
Weekly newspapers published in Australia